The Togolese Second Division  is a football league featuring clubs from Togo, and is the second competition of Togolese football. It is administered by the Togolese Football Federation.

Clubs
Abou Ossé
Agouwa de Koussountou 
Odalou de Kabolé
Sara Sport de Bafilo
ASCK de Kara 
AS Binah de Pagouda
Tigre Noir de Cinkassé
AS Dankpen
Doumbé de Mango

References

Football leagues in Togo
Second level football leagues in Africa